

Amateur boxing

2016 Summer Olympics (AIBA)
 August 6 – 21: 2016 Summer Olympics in  Rio de Janeiro at the Riocentro
 Men
 Men's Light Flyweight:   Hasanboy Dusmatov;   Yuberjén Martínez;   Joahnys Argilagos;   Nico Hernández
 Men's Flyweight:   Shakhobidin Zoirov;   Mikhail Aloyan;   Yoel Finol;   Hu Jianguan
 Men's Bantamweight:   Robeisy Ramírez;   Shakur Stevenson;   Vladimir Nikitin;   Murodjon Akhmadaliev
 Men's Lightweight:   Robson Conceição;   Sofiane Oumiha;   Lázaro Álvarez;   Dorjnyambuugiin Otgondalai
 Men's Light Welterweight:   Fazliddin Gaibnazarov;   Lorenzo Sotomayor;   Vitaly Dunaytsev;   Artem Harutyunyan
 Men's Welterweight:   Daniyar Yeleussinov;   Shakhram Giyasov;   Mohammed Rabii;   Souleymane Cissokho
 Men's Middleweight:   Arlen López;   Bektemir Melikuziev;   Misael Rodríguez;   Kamran Shakhsuvarly
 Men's Light Heavyweight:   Julio César La Cruz;   Adilbek Niyazymbetov;   Mathieu Bauderlique;   Joshua Buatsi
 Men's Heavyweight:   Evgeny Tishchenko;   Vassiliy Levit;   Rustam Tulaganov;   Erislandy Savón
 Men's Super Heavyweight:   Tony Yoka;   Joe Joyce;   Filip Hrgović;   Ivan Dychko
 Women
 Women's Flyweight:   Nicola Adams;   Sarah Ourahmoune;   Ren Cancan;   Ingrit Valencia
 Women's Lightweight:   Estelle Mossely;   Yin Junhua;   Mira Potkonen;   Anastasia Belyakova
 Women's Middleweight:   Claressa Shields;   Nouchka Fontijn;   Dariga Shakimova;   Li Qian

World and continental boxing championships
 March 11 – 19: 2016 AIBA American Continental Championships in  Buenos Aires
 The  won both the gold and overall medal tallies.
 March 11 – 19: 2016 AIBA African Continental Championships in  Yaoundé
  won the gold medal tally. Morocco and  won 7 overall medals each.
 March 25 – April 2: 2016 AIBA Asia/Oceania Continental Championships in  Qian'an, Hebei
  won the gold medal tally.  won the overall medal tally.
 April 9 – 17: 2016 AIBA European Continental Championships in  Samsun
  won both the gold and overall medal tallies.
 May 19 – 27: 2016 AIBA Women's World Boxing Championships in  Astana
  won the gold medal tally. Kazakhstan and  won 6 overall medals each. 
 June 14 – 26: AIBA's Final World Olympic Qualification Event in  Baku
  won the gold medal tally. The  and  won 3 overall medals each.
 July 3 – 8: AIBA Pro Boxing (APB) / WSB Olympic Qualification Tournament 2016 in  Vargas
 Men's 49 kg winner:  Joselito Velazquez Altamirano
 Men's 52 kg winner:  Yoel Segundo Finol Rivas
 Men's 56 kg winner: 
 Men's 60 kg winner:  Lindolfo Delgado Garza
 Men's 64 kg winner:  Hovhannes Bachkov
 Men's 69 kg winner:  Juan Pablo Romero Marin
 Men's 75 kg winner:  Marlo Delgado
 Men's 81 kg winner:  Juan Carlos Carrillo Palacio
 Men's 91 kg winner:  Julio Castillo
 Men's +91 kg winner:  Edgar Muñoz
 October 3 – 8: 2016 World University Boxing Championships in  Chiang Mai
  won the gold medal tally.  won the overall medal tally.
 November 14 – 26: 2016 AIBA Youth World Boxing Championships in  Saint Petersburg
  and the  won 2 gold medals each. Cuba, the United States, and  won 4 overall medals each.

Fencing
 September 19, 2015 – August 14, 2016: 2015–16 FIE Events Calendar

2016 Summer Olympics (FIE)
 August 6 – 14: 2016 Summer Olympics in  Rio de Janeiro at the Olympic Training Center
 Men's individual épée:   Park Sang-young;   Géza Imre;   Gauthier Grumier
 Men's individual foil:   Daniele Garozzo;   Alexander Massialas;   Timur Safin
 Men's individual sabre:   Áron Szilágyi;   Daryl Homer;   Kim Jung-hwan
 Women's individual épée:   Emese Szász;   Rossella Fiamingo;   Sun Yiwen
 Women's individual foil:   Inna Deriglazova;   Elisa Di Francisca;   Inès Boubakri
 Women's individual sabre:   Yana Egorian;   Sofiya Velikaya;   Olha Kharlan
 Men's team épée:  ;  ;  
 Men's team foil:  ;  ;  
 Women's team épée:  ;  ;  
 Women's team sabre:  ;  ;

International fencing championships
 April 1 – 10: 2016 Junior and Cadet World Fencing Championships in  Bourges

 Junior:  and  won 3 gold medals each. Russia and  won 9 overall medals each.
 Cadet:  won both the gold and overall medal tallies.
 April 13 – 18: 2016 Asian Fencing Championships in  Wuxi
  won both the gold and overall medal tallies.
 April 15 – 19: 2016 African Fencing Championships in  Algiers

  won the gold medal tally. Tunisia and  won 13 overall medals each.
 April 25 – 27: 2016 World Fencing Championships in  Rio de Janeiro (Olympic Test Event)
 Men's team sabre winners: 
 Women's team foil winners: 
 June 20 – 25: 2016 European Fencing Championships in  Toruń

  won both the gold and overall medal tallies.
 June 20 – 26: 2016 Pan American Fencing Championships in  Panama City

 The  won both the gold and overall medal tallies.

2015–16 Fencing Grand Prix
 Épée Grand Prix
 December 4 – 6, 2015: Qatari Grand Prix in  Doha
 Men's Individual winner:  Vadim Anokhin
 Women's Individual winner:  Mara Navarria
 March 18 – 20: Hungarian Grand Prix in  Budapest
 Men's Individual winner:  Gauthier Grumier
 Women's Individual winner:  Xu Anqi
 April 22 – 24: Brazilian Grand Prix in  Rio de Janeiro (Olympic Test Event)
 Men's Individual winner:  Bohdan Nikishyn
 Women's Individual winner:  Tatiana Logunova
 Foil Grand Prix
 November 27 – 29, 2015: Italian Grand Prix in  Turin
 Men's Individual winner:  Ma Jianfei
 Women's Individual winner:  Alice Volpi
 March 11 – 13: Cuban Grand Prix in  Havana
 Men's Individual winner:  Richard Kruse
 Women's Individual winner:  Arianna Errigo
 June 3 – 5: Chinese Grand Prix in  Shanghai
 Men's Individual winner:  Alexander Massialas
 Women's Individual winner:  Arianna Errigo
 Sabre Grand Prix
 December 12 & 13, 2015: American Grand Prix in  Boston
 Men's Individual winner:  Aldo Montano
 Women's Individual winner:  Shen Chen
 March 25 & 26: Korean Grand Prix in  Seoul
 Men's Individual winner:  Eli Dershwitz
 Women's Individual winner:  Yana Egorian
 May 27 – 29: Russian Grand Prix in  Moscow
 Men's Individual winner:  Kim Jung-hwan
 Women's Individual winner:  Olha Kharlan

2015–16 Fencing World Cup
 Men's Épée World Cup
 October 23 – 25, 2015: Swiss World Cup in  Bern
 Individual:  Bas Verwijlen
 Team: 
 November 13 – 15, 2015: Estonian World Cup in  Tallinn
 Individual:  Kazuyasu Minobe 
 Team: 
 January 21 – 23: German Épée World Cup in  Heidenheim an der Brenz
 Individual:  Gauthier Grumier
 Team: 
 February 12 – 14: Canadian World Cup in  Vancouver
 Individual:  Enrico Garozzo
 Team: 
 May 20 – 22: French Épée World Cup in  Paris
 Individual:  Gauthier Grumier
 Team: 
 Women's Épée World Cup
 October 23 – 25, 2015: Italian Épée World Cup #1 in  Legnano
 Individual:  SUN Yiwen
 Team: 
 November 13 – 15, 2015: Chinese Épée World Cup in  Nanjing
 Individual:  Ana Maria Brânză
 Team: 
 January 22 – 24: Spanish Épée World Cup in  Barcelona
 Individual:  Mara Navarria
 Team: 
 February 12 – 14: Argentinian World Cup in  Buenos Aires
 Individual:  Violetta Kolobova
 Team: 
 May 20 – 22: Italian Épée World Cup #2 in  Legnano
 Individual:  Erika Kirpu
 Team: 
 Men's Foil World Cup
 October 16 – 18, 2015: American World Cup in  San Jose, California
 Individual:  Timur Safin
 Team: 
 November 6 – 8, 2015: Japanese World Cup in  Tokyo
 Individual:  Alexander Massialas
 Team: 
 January 15 – 17: French Men's Foil World Cup in  Paris
 Individual:  Race Imboden
 Team: 
 February 5 – 7: German Men's Foil World Cup in  Bonn
 Individual:  James Davis
 Team: 
 May 13 – 15: Russian World Cup in  Saint Petersburg
 Individual:  Dmitry Zherebchenko
 Team: 
 Women's Foil World Cup
 October 16 – 18, 2015: Mexican World Cup in  Cancún
 Individual:  Ysaora Thibus
 Team: 
 November 6 – 8, 2015: French Women's Foil World Cup in  Saint-Maur-des-Fossés
 Individual:  Arianna Errigo
 Team: 
 January 15 – 17: Polish Foil World Cup in  Gdańsk
 Individual:  Arianna Errigo
 Team: 
 February 5 – 7: Algerian World Cup in  Algiers
 Individual:  Elisa Di Francisca
 Team: 
 May 20 – 22: German Women's Foil World Cup in  Tauberbischofsheim
 Individual:  Inna Deriglazova
 Team: 
 Men's Sabre World Cup
 October 9 – 11, 2015: Georgian World Cup in  Tbilisi
 Individual:  Aleksey Yakimenko
 Team:  
 October 30 – November 1, 2015: Hungarian World Cup in  Budapest
 Individual:  Aleksey Yakimenko
 Team: 
 January 29 – 31: Italian Sabre World Cup in  Padua
 Individual:  Aldo Montano
 Team: 
 February 19 – 21: Polish Sabre World Cup in  Warsaw
 Individual:  Gu Bon-gil
 Team: 
 May 13 – 15: Spanish Sabre World Cup in  Madrid
 Individual:  Vincent Anstett
 Team: 
 Women's Sabre World Cup
 October 9 – 11, 2015: Venezuelan World Cup in  Caracas
 Individual:  Mariel Zagunis
 Team: 
 October 30 – November 1, 2015: French Sabre World Cup in  Orléans
 Individual:  Yana Egorian
 Team: 
 January 29 – 31: Greek World Cup in  Athens
 Individual:  Mariel Zagunis
 Team: 
 February 19 – 21: Belgian World Cup in  Ghent
 Individual:  Olha Kharlan
 Team: 
 May 13 – 15: Chinese Sabre World Cup in  Foshan
 Individual:  Olha Kharlan
 Team:

Judo

2016 Summer Olympics (IJF)
 March 8 & 9: Aquece Rio International Judo Tournament 2016 in  Rio de Janeiro (Olympic Test Event)
 Men's U66 winner:  Joshiro Maruyama
 Men's U81 winner:  Eduardo Yudi Santos
 Women's U52 winner:  Chishima Maeda
 Women's U63 winner:  Kaho Yonezawa
 August 6 – 12: 2016 Summer Olympics in  Rio de Janeiro at the Olympic Training Center
 Men
 Men's 60 kg:   Beslan Mudranov;   Yeldos Smetov;   Naohisa Takato;   Diyorbek Urozboev
 Men's 66 kg:   Fabio Basile;   An Baul;   Rishod Sobirov;   Masashi Ebinuma
 Men's 73 kg:   Shohei Ono;   Rustam Orujov;   Lasha Shavdatuashvili;   Dirk Van Tichelt
 Men's 81 kg:   Khasan Khalmurzaev;   Travis Stevens;   Sergiu Toma;   Takanori Nagase
 Men's 90 kg:   Mashu Baker;   Varlam Liparteliani;   Gwak Dong-han;   Cheng Xunzhao
 Men's 100 kg:   Lukáš Krpálek;   Elmar Gasimov;   Cyrille Maret;   Ryunosuke Haga
 Men's +100 kg:   Teddy Riner;   Hisayoshi Harasawa;   Rafael Silva;   Or Sasson
 Women
 Women's 48 kg:   Paula Pareto;   Jeong Bo-kyeong;   Ami Kondo;   Galbadrakhyn Otgontsetseg
 Women's 52 kg:   Majlinda Kelmendi;   Odette Giuffrida;   Misato Nakamura;   Natalia Kuziutina
 Women's 57 kg:   Rafaela Silva;   Dorjsürengiin Sumiyaa;   Telma Monteiro;   Kaori Matsumoto
 Women's 63 kg:   Tina Trstenjak;   Clarisse Agbegnenou;   Yarden Gerbi;   Anicka van Emden
 Women's 70 kg:   Haruka Tachimoto;   Yuri Alvear;   Sally Conway;   Laura Vargas Koch
 Women's 78 kg:   Kayla Harrison;   Audrey Tcheuméo;   Mayra Aguiar;   Anamari Velenšek
 Women's +78 kg:   Émilie Andéol;   Idalys Ortiz;   Kanae Yamabe;   Yu Song

International judo events
 April 8 – 10: 2016 African Judo Championships in  Tunis
  won the gold medal tally.  won the overall medal tally.
 April 8 – 10: 2016 Oceania Judo Championships in  Canberra
 Seniors:  won both the gold and overall medal tallies.
 Cadet:  won both the gold and overall medal tallies.
 Junior:  won both the gold and overall medal tallies.
 April 15 – 17: 2016 Asian Judo Championships in  Tashkent
  and  won 4 gold and 11 overall medals each. 
 April 21 – 24: 2016 European Judo Championships in  Kazan
  won the gold medal tally. France and  won 7 overall medals each.
 April 29 & 30: 2016 Pan American Judo Championships in  Havana
  won both the gold and overall medal tallies.
 May 27 – 29: 2016 Masters Judo Championships in  Guadalajara
  won both the gold and overall medal tallies.
 September 3 & 4: 2016 Asian Open in  Taipei
  won the gold medal tally.  won the overall medal tally.

Judo Grand Slam
 February 6 & 7: Grand Slam #1 in  Paris
  won the gold medal tally. Japan and  won 9 overall medals each.
 May 6 – 8: Grand Slam #2 in  Baku
  won both the gold and overall medal tallies.
 July 16 & 17: Grand Slam #3 in  Tyumen
  won the gold medal tally.  won the overall medal tally.
 October 28 – 30: Grand Slam #4 in  Abu Dhabi
  won the gold medal tally.  won the overall medal tally.
 December 2 – 4: Grand Slam #5 (final) in  Tokyo
  won both the gold and overall medal tallies.

Judo Grand Prix
 January 22 – 24: Grand Prix #1 in  Havana
  won the gold medal tally.  won the overall medal tally.
 February 19 & 20: Grand Prix #2 in  Düsseldorf
  and  won 3 gold medals each. South Korea won the overall medal tally.
 March 25 – 27: Grand Prix #3 in  Tbilisi
 The  won the gold medal tally.  won the overall medal tally.
 April 1 – 4: Grand Prix #4 in  Samsun
  won both the gold and overall medal tallies.
 May 13 – 15: Grand Prix #5 in  Almaty
  won the gold medal tally.  won the overall medal tally.
 June 25 & 26: Grand Prix #6 in  Budapest
  won both the gold and overall medal tallies.
 July 1 – 3: Grand Prix #7 in  Ulaanbaatar
  won both the gold and overall medal tallies.
 September 23 – 25: Grand Prix #8 in  Zagreb
  won both the gold and overall medal tallies.
 October 6 – 8: Grand Prix #9 in  Tashkent
  won both the gold and overall medal tallies.
 November 18 – 20: Grand Prix #10 (final) in  Qingdao
  and  won 4 gold medals each.  won the overall medal tally.

European Judo Union (EJU)
 January 30 – October 30: 2016 EJU Open and Cup events

EJU Open
 January 30 & 31: EJU Open #1 in  Sofia
  and  won 2 gold medals each.  won the overall medal tally.
 February 13 & 14: EJU Open #2 in  Oberwart (men only)
  won the gold medal tally.  won the overall medal tally.
 February 13 & 14: EJU Open #3 in  Rome (women only)
 Seven different nations won a gold medal each.  won the overall medal tally.
 February 27 & 28: EJU Open #4 in  Prague (men only)
 The  won the gold medal tally.  won the overall medal tally.
 February 27 & 28: EJU Open #5 in  Warsaw (women only)
  won the gold medal tally.  and  won 5 overall medals each.
 June 4 & 5: EJU Open #6 in  Madrid
  won the gold medal tally.  won the overall medal tally. 
 September 10 & 11: EJU Open #7 in  Tallinn
  and  won 2 gold medals each.  won the overall medal tally.
 October 15 & 16: EJU Open #8 (final) in  Glasgow
  won the gold medal tally.  won the overall medal tally.

EJU Cup
 March 5 & 6: EJU Cup #1 in  Uster
  won both the gold and overall medal tallies.
 March 19 & 20: EJU Cup #2 in  Sarajevo
 Five different nations won 2 gold medals each.  won the overall medal tally.
 April 2 & 3: EJU Cup #3 in  Dubrovnik
  won the gold medal tally. Croatia and  won 9 overall medals each. 
 May 14 & 15: EJU Cup #4 in  Orenburg
  won both the gold and overall medal tallies.
 June 11 & 12: EJU Cup #5 in  Celje-Podčetrtek
  won both the gold and overall medal tallies.
 July 9 & 10: EJU Cup #6 in  Bratislava
  won both the gold and overall medal tallies.
 August 27 & 28: EJU Cup #7 in  Saarbrücken
  won both the gold and overall medal tallies.
 October 1 & 2: EJU Cup #8 in  Tampere
  won both the gold and overall medal tallies.
 October 8 & 9: EJU Cup #9 in  Belgrade
  won both the gold and overall medal tallies.
 October 29 & 30: EJU Cup #10 (final) in  Málaga
  won both the gold and overall medal tallies.

Pan American Judo Confederation (CPJ)
 March 5 & 6: CPJ Open #1 in  Lima
  and  won 2 gold medals each. Brazil won the overall medal tally.
 March 12 & 13: CPJ Open #2 in  Buenos Aires
  and  won 3 gold medals each. Russia won the overall medal tally.
 March 19 & 20: CPJ Open #3 in  Santiago
  won the gold medal tally.  won the overall medal tally.
 July 2 & 3: CPJ Open #4 (final) in  San Salvador
 The  won both the gold and overall medal tallies.

African Judo Union (AJU)
 January 16 & 17: AJU Open #1 in  Tunis

  won both the gold and overall medal tallies.
 March 12 & 13: AJU Open #2 (final) in  Casablanca
 14 nations won a gold medal each.  won the overall medal tally.

Kickboxing

Kunlun Fight

Mixed martial arts

UFC

Rizin Fighting Federation

Konfrontacja Sztuk Walki

Taekwondo
 January 16 – TBD: 2016 WTF Calendar of Events

2016 Summer Olympics (WTF)
 February 20 & 21: Aquece Rio International Taekwondo Tournament 2016 in  Rio de Janeiro (Olympic Test Event)
 Four different nations won a gold medal each.  won the overall medal tally.
 August 17 – 20: 2016 Summer Olympics in  Rio de Janeiro at the Olympic Training Center
 Men
 Men's 58 kg:   Zhao Shuai;   Tawin Hanprab;   Luisito Pie;   Kim Tae-hun
 Men's 68 kg:   Ahmad Abughaush;   Alexey Denisenko;   Lee Dae-hoon;   Joel González
 Men's 80 kg:   Cheick Sallah Cisse;   Lutalo Muhammad;   Milad Beigi;   Oussama Oueslati
 Men's +80 kg:   Radik Isayev;   Abdoul Razak Issoufou;   Maicon de Andrade;   Cha Dong-min
 Women
 Women's 49 kg:   Kim So-hui;   Tijana Bogdanović;   Patimat Abakarova;   Panipak Wongpattanakit
 Women's 57 kg:   Jade Jones;   Eva Calvo;   Kimia Alizadeh;   Hedaya Malak
 Women's 67 kg:   Oh Hye-ri;   Haby Niaré;   Ruth Gbagbi;   Nur Tatar
 Women's +67 kg:   Zheng Shuyin;   María Espinoza;   Bianca Walkden;   Jackie Galloway

International taekwondo championships
 January 16 & 17: 2016 WTF European Olympic Qualification Tournament in  Istanbul
  won both the gold and overall medal tallies.
 February 6 & 7: 2016 WTF African Olympic Qualification Tournament in  Agadir
Morocco and Tunisia won 3 overall medals each.
 February 18 – 20: 2016 Asian Club Taekwondo Championships in  Dubai
 Men's winners:  Shahrdari Varamin
 Women's winners:  Team Kan
 February 27: 2016 WTF Oceania Olympic Qualification Tournament in  Port Moresby
 Men's 58 kg winner:  Safwan Khalil
 Men's 68 kg winner:  Maxemillion Kassman
 Men's 80 kg winner:  Hayder Shkara
 Men's +80 kg winner:  Pita Taufatofua
 Women's 49 kg winner:  Andrea Kilday
 Women's 57 kg winner:  Caroline Marton
 Women's 67 kg winner:  Carmen Marton
 Women's +67 kg winner:  Samantha Kassman
 March 10 & 11: 2016 WTF Pan American Olympic Qualification Tournament in  Aguascalientes City
 The  and the  won 2 gold medals each. The Dominican Republic, and  won 4 overall medals each.
 April 7 – 9: 2016 World Taekwondo President's Cup (European Region) in  Bonn (debut event)
  won the gold medal tally.
 April 16 & 17: 2016 Asian Taekwondo Olympic Qualification Tournament in  Pasay
  won the gold medal tally.
 April 19 & 20: 2016 Asian Taekwondo Championships in  Pasay
 Men:  and  won 3 gold medals each. Iran won the overall medal tally.
 Women:  won both the gold and overall medal tallies.
 May 19 – 22: 2016 European Taekwondo Championships in  Montreux
  won the gold medal tally.  won the overall medal tally. 
 May 20 & 21: 2016 African Taekwondo Championships in  Port Said
 Men's 58 kg winner:  Yousef Shriha
 Men's 68 kg winner:  Ghofran Zaki
 Men's 87 kg winner:  Yassine Trabelsi
 Men's +87 kg winner:  Abdoul Issoufou
 Women's 49 kg winner:  Nour Abdelsalam
 Women's 57 kg winner:  Hedaya Malak
 Women's 67 kg winner:  Seham El-Sawalhy
 Women's 73 kg winner:  Maisoun Farouk
 June 10 – 11: 2016 Pan American Taekwondo Championships in  Querétaro City
  won both the gold and overall medal tallies.
 July 16 & 17: 2016 WTF President's Cup (Oceania Region) in  Canberra
  won all the gold medals here. South Korea also won the overall medal tally.
 July 23 & 24: 2016 WTF World Beach Taekwondo Championships in  Bali (debut event)
 Event cancelled, due to financial problems.
 September 29 – October 2: 2016 World Taekwondo Poomsae Championships  Lima
  won the gold medal tally. The  won the overall medal tally. 
 October 28 – 30: 2016 WTF President's Cup (Pan American) in  Portland, Oregon
  won the gold medal tally. The  won the overall medal tally.
 November 16 – 20: 2016 WTF World Junior Taekwondo Championships in  Burnaby
  won the gold medal tally.  won the overall medal tally.
 November 26 – 28: 2016 WTF Oceania Taekwondo Championships in  Suva
  won both the gold and overall medal tallies.
 December 9 & 10: 2016 WTF Grand Prix Final in  Baku
  won the gold medal tally.  and  won 5 overall medals each.
 December 12 & 13: 2016 WTF World Taekwondo Team Championships in  Baku
 Men: ; Women: ; Mixed:

WTF Open
 February 2 – 7: 2016 United States Open in  Reno, Nevada
  won both the gold and overall medal tallies.
 February 11 – 14: 2016 Canada Open in  Montreal
  won the gold medal tally.  won the overall medal tally.
 February 12 – 14: 2016 Turkish Open in  Belek
  won both the gold and overall medal tallies.
 February 23 – 25: 2016 Fujairah Open in the 
 March 4 – 6: 2016 Luxor Open in 
  won the gold medal tally.  and  won 7 overall medals each.
 March 11 – 13: 2016 Dutch Open in  Eindhoven
  won both the gold and overall medal tallies.
 March 12 & 13: 2016 Mexican Open in  Aguascalientes City
  and  won 2 gold medals each. Mexico won the overall medal tally.
 March 12 – 15: 2016 Qatar Open in  Doha
  won the gold medal tally.  won the overall medal tally.
 March 18 – 20: 2016 Belgian Open in  Lommel
  won both the gold and overall medal tallies.
 March 25 – 27: 2016 Ukraine Open in  Lviv
  won the gold medal tally.  won the overall medal tally.
 April 15 – 17: 2016 Spanish Open in  Benicàssim
  won the gold medal tally.  won the overall medal tally.
 April 23 & 24: 2016 German Open in  Hamburg
  won the gold medal tally.  won the overall medal tally.
 May 6 – 8: 2016 Fajr Open in  Tehran
 Men's 58 kg winner:  Mohammad Kazemi
 Men's 68 kg winner:  Seyed Hossein Ehsani
 Men's 80 kg winner:  Arutiun Meliksetiants
 Men's +80 kg winner:  Farshad Ghiyasi
 June 4 & 5: 2016 Austrian Open in  Innsbruck
  won the gold medal tally.  won the overall medal tally.
 June 10 – 12: 2016 Greek Open in  Thessaloniki
  won the gold medal tally.  won the overall medal tally.
 June 30 – July 5: 2016 Korean Open in  Gyeongju
 July 9 & 10: 2016 Luxembourg Open in  Kirchberg, Luxembourg
  and  won 3 gold medals each. Turkey won the overall medal tally.
 July 15 – 17: 2016 Australian Open
 Event cancelled.
 July 18 – 20: 2016 Palestinian Open in  Ramallah
 Men:  won the gold medal tally. Morocco, and  won 7 overall medals each.
 Women:  won both the gold and overall medal tallies.
 August 26 – 28: 2016 Costa Rica Open in  San José, Costa Rica
 The  won both the gold and overall medal tallies.
 September 17 & 18: 2016 Polish Open in  Warsaw
  won both the gold and overall medal tallies.
 September 22 – 25: 2016 Russian Open in  Moscow
  won the gold medal tally.  won the overall medal tally.
 October 8 & 9: 2016 Riga Open in 
  won both the gold and overall medal tallies.
 October 29 & 30: 2016 Serbia Open in  Belgrade
  won both the gold and overall medal tallies.
 November 12 & 13: 2016 Croatia Open in  Zagreb
  won the gold medal tally.  won the overall medal tally.
 November 26 & 27: 2016 French Open in  Paris
  and  won 3 gold medals each. Spain won the overall medal tally.
 November 27 & 28: 2016 Israeli Open in  Ramla
  won both the gold and overall medal tallies.

Wrestling
 January 9 – December 9: 2016 UWW Events Calendar

2016 Summer Olympics (UWW)
 January 30 & 31: Aquece Rio International Women's Wrestling Tournament in  Rio de Janeiro (Olympic Test Event)
 Women's Freestyle:  won both the gold and overall medal tallies.
 March 4 – 6: 2016 Pan-American Olympic Qualifying Event in  Frisco, Texas
 Men's Freestyle:  won both the gold and overall medal tallies.
 Women's Freestyle:  won the gold medal tally. Canada, and  won 4 overall medals each.
 Greco-Roman:  and  won 2 gold medals each. Venezuela won the overall medal tally.
 March 18 – 20: 2016 Asian Olympic Qualifying Event in  Astana
 Men's Freestyle: Six nations won a gold medal each.  won the overall medal tally.
 Women's Freestyle:  won both the gold and overall medal tallies.
 Greco-Roman:  won the gold medal tally. China and  won 4 overall medals each.
 April 1 – 3: 2016 African and Oceania Olympic Qualifying Event in  Algiers
 Men's Freestyle:  and  won 2 gold medals each. Egypt won the overall medal tally. 
 Women's Freestyle:  and  won 2 gold medals each. Nigeria won the overall medal tally.
 Greco-Roman:  won both the gold and overall medal tallies.
 April 15 – 17: 2016 European Olympic Qualifying Event in  Zrenjanin
 Men's Freestyle:  won both the gold and overall medal tallies.
 Women's Freestyle:  and  won 2 gold medals each.  won the overall medal tally.
 Greco-Roman:  and  won 2 gold medals each.  and  won 3 overall medals each.
 April 21 – 23: First Olympic Games World Qualifying Event in  Ulaanbaatar
 Men's Freestyle: Six nations won one gold medal each.
 Women's Freestyle: Six nations won one gold medal each.  and the  won 3 overall medals each.
 Greco-Roman:  won the gold medal tally. Belarus, and  all won 2 overall medals each.
 May 6 – 8: Second and Final Olympic Games World Qualifying Event in  Istanbul
 Men's Freestyle: Six nations won a gold medal each.
 Women's Freestyle:  and  won 2 gold medals each. Ukraine won the overall medal tally.
 Greco-Roman:  won both the gold and overall medal tallies.
 August 14 – 21: 2016 Summer Olympics in  Rio de Janeiro at the Olympic Training Center
 Men's Freestyle
 Men's 57 kg:   Vladimer Khinchegashvili;   Rei Higuchi;   Haji Aliyev;   Hassan Rahimi
 Men's 65 kg:   Soslan Ramonov;   Toghrul Asgarov;   Frank Chamizo;   Ikhtiyor Navruzov
 Men's 74 kg:   Hassan Yazdani;   Aniuar Geduev;   Jabrayil Hasanov;   Soner Demirtaş
 Men's 86 kg:   Abdulrashid Sadulaev;   Selim Yaşar;   Sharif Sharifov;   J'den Cox
 Men's 97 kg:   Kyle Snyder;   Khetag Gazyumov;   Albert Saritov;   Magomed Abdulmuminovich Ibragimov
 Men's 125 kg:   Taha Akgül;   Komeil Ghasemi;   Ibrahim Saidau;   Geno Petriashvili
 Women's Freestyle
 Women's 48 kg:   Eri Tosaka;   Mariya Stadnik;   Sun Yanan;   Elitsa Yankova
 Women's 53 kg:   Helen Maroulis;   Saori Yoshida;   Nataliya Synyshyn;   Sofia Mattsson
 Women's 58 kg:   Kaori Icho;   Valeria Koblova;   Marwa Amri;   Sakshi Malik
 Women's 63 kg:   Risako Kawai;   Maryia Mamashuk;   Yekaterina Larionova;   Monika Michalik
 Women's 69 kg:   Sara Dosho;   Nataliya Vorobyova;   Elmira Syzdykova;   Jenny Fransson
 Women's 75 kg:   Erica Wiebe;   Guzel Manyurova;   Zhang Fengliu;   Ekaterina Bukina
 Greco-Roman
 Men's 59 kg:   Ismael Borrero;   Shinobu Ota;   Elmurat Tasmuradov;   Stig André Berge
 Men's 66 kg:   Davor Štefanek;   Migran Arutyunyan;   Shmagi Bolkvadze;   Rasul Chunayev
 Men's 75 kg:   Roman Vlasov;   Mark Madsen;   Kim Hyeon-woo;   Saeid Abdevali
 Men's 85 kg:   Davit Chakvetadze;   Zhan Beleniuk;   Javid Hamzatau;   Denis Kudla
 Men's 98 kg:   Artur Aleksanyan;   Yasmany Lugo;   Cenk İldem;   Ghasem Rezaei
 Men's 130 kg:   Mijaín López;   Rıza Kayaalp;   Sabah Shariati;   Sergey Semenov

World wrestling championships
 August 30 – September 4: 2016 World Junior Wrestling Championships in  Mâcon
Russia won the overall medal tally.
 Junior Women's Freestyle:  won both the gold and overall medal tallies.
 Junior Greco-Roman:  won both the gold and overall medal tallies.
 September 13 – 18: 2016 World Cadet Wrestling Championships in  Tbilisi
 Cadet Men's Freestyle: The  won the gold medal tally. The United States and  won 7 overall medals each.
 Cadet Women's Freestyle:  won both the gold and overall medal tallies.
 Cadet Greco-Roman:  and  won 2 gold medals each.  won the overall medal tally.
 September 23 – 25: 2016 World Veteran Wrestling Championships (Greco-Roman) in  Seinäjoki
 For results, click here and click at the Results & Videos tab.
 October 7 – 9: 2016 World Veteran Wrestling Championships (Men's & Women's Freestyle) in  Wałbrzych
 For results, click here and click at the Results & Videos tab.
 October 25 – 30: 2016 World University Wrestling Championships in  Çorum
 Men's Freestyle:  won both the gold and overall medal tallies.
 Women's Freestyle:  and  won 3 gold medals each. Russia won the overall medal tally.
 Greco-Roman:  won the gold medal tally.  and  won 6 overall medals each.
 December 10 & 11: 2016 Non-Olympic Weight Categories World Championships in  Budapest
 Men's Freestyle (61 kg) winner:  Logan Stieber
 Men's Freestyle (70 kg) winner:  Magomed Kurbanaliev
 Women's Freestyle (55 kg) winner:  Mayu Mukaida
 Women's Freestyle (60 kg) winner:  PEI Xingru
 Greco-Roman (71 kg) winner:  Bálint Korpasi
 Greco-Roman (80 kg) winner:  Ramazan Abacharaev

World cup of wrestling
 May 19 & 20: 2016 Wrestling World Cup - Men's Greco-Roman in  Shiraz
  won all the gold medals.  won all the silver medals.  won all the bronze medals. 
 June 11 & 12: 2016 Wrestling World Cup - Men's Freestyle in  Los Angeles
  won the gold medal tally. Iran and  won 8 overall medals each.
 November 30 – December 1: 2016 World Wrestling Clubs Cup for Men's Freestyle in  Kharkiv
 The  won the gold medal tally.  won all the bronze medals; therefore, this country won the overall medal tally.
 December 8 & 9: 2016 World Wrestling Clubs Cup for Men's Greco-Roman in  Budapest
  won both the gold and overall medal tallies.

Grand Prix of wrestling
 January 23: Grand Prix Zagreb Open in 
 Greco-Roman:  won the gold medal tally. Hungary and  won 8 overall medals each.
 February 5 – 7: Hungarian Grand Prix in  Szombathely
 Greco-Roman:  won the gold medal tally.  won the overall medal tally.
 May 14 & 15: Grand Prix of Germany #1 in  Dormagen
 Women's Freestyle:  won the gold medal tally.  and  won 7 overall medals each.
 July 2 & 3: Grand Prix of Germany #2 in  Dortmund
 Men's Freestyle:  won both the gold and overall medal tallies.
Russia won the overall medal tally.
 July 9 & 10: Grand Prix of Spain in  Madrid
Mongolia won the overall medal tally.
 Women's Freestyle:  won both the gold and overall medal tallies.
 Greco-Roman:  won both the gold and overall medal tallies.
 November 24 – 26: 2016 Golden Grand Prix Final in  Baku
 Men's Freestyle:  won both the gold and overall medal tallies.
China won the overall medal tally.
 Greco-Roman:  won both the gold and overall medal tallies.

Continental wrestling championships
 February 12 – 16: 2016 Asian Wrestling Championships in  Bangkok
 Men's Freestyle:  won both the gold and overall medal tallies.
 Women's Freestyle:  won both the gold and overall medal tallies.
 Greco-Roman:  won both the gold and overall medal tallies.
 February 26 – 28: 2016 Pan-American Wrestling Championships in  Frisco, Texas
 Men's Freestyle: The  won both the gold and overall medal tallies.
 Women's Freestyle:  and the  won 3 gold medals each. The United States won the overall medal tally.
 Greco-Roman:  won the gold medal tally. The  won the overall medal tally.
 March 4 – 6: 2016 African Wrestling Championships in  Alexandria
 Men's Freestyle:  won the gold medal tally.  won the overall medal tally.
 Women's Freestyle:  won the gold medal tally. Nigeria, and  won 6 overall medals each.
 Greco-Roman:  won both the gold and overall medal tallies.
 March 8 – 13: 2016 European Wrestling Championships in  Riga
 Men's Freestyle:  won the gold medal tally.  won the overall medal tally.
 Women's Freestyle:  won the gold medal tally.  won the overall medal tally.
 Greco-Roman:  won the gold medal tally.  won the overall medal tally.
 March 11 & 12: 2016 Oceania Wrestling Championships in  Hamilton, New Zealand
 Men's Freestyle:  won both the gold and overall medal tallies.
 Women's Freestyle:  won both the gold and overall medal tallies.
 Greco-Roman: New Zealand won the gold medal tally. New Zealand and  won 7 overall medals each.
 Beach Wrestling: New Zealand won both the gold and overall medal tallies.
 Junior Men's Freestyle: New Zealand won both the gold and overall medal tallies.
 Junior Women's Freestyle: , Australia, and  won a gold medal each. Guam won the overall medal tally.
 Junior Greco-Roman: American Samoa won both the gold and overall medal tallies.
 Cadet Men's Freestyle: New Zealand won both the gold and overall medal tallies.
 Cadet Women's Freestyle winners: 
 56 kg:  Millie Culshaw (default)
 60 kg:  Rckaela Maree Ramos Aquino (default)
 Cadet Greco-Roman: New Zealand won both the gold and overall medal tallies.
 Cadet Beach Wrestling winner:  Ronin Ainsley
 March 29 – April 3: 2016 European U23 Championship in  Ruse, Bulgaria
 Men's Freestyle:  won both the gold and overall medal tallies.
Russia and Ukraine won 6 overall medals each.
 Greco-Roman:  won both the gold and overall medal tallies.
 May 28 & 29: 2016 Nordic Wrestling Championship in  Tallinn
 Women's Freestyle:  won the gold medal tally.  won the overall medal tally. 
 Greco-Roman:  won both the gold and overall medal tallies.
 Junior Greco-Roman:  won both the gold and overall medal tallies. 
 Cadet Women's Freestyle:  won both the gold and overall medal tallies.
 Cadet Greco-Roman:  won the gold medal tally. Norway and  won 6 overall medals each.
 May 31 – June 5: 2016 Asian Junior Wrestling Championships in  Manila
 Junior Men's Freestyle:  won the gold medal tally.  won the overall medal tally.
 Junior Women's Freestyle:  won the gold medal tally. China and  won 7 overall medals each.
 Junior Greco-Roman:  won the gold medal tally.  won the overall medal tally.
 June 10 – 12: 2016 Pan-American Junior Wrestling Championships in  Barinas
 Junior Men's Freestyle:  and  won 3 gold and 6 overall medals each.
 Junior Women's Freestyle:  won the gold medal tally. Venezuela and  won 7 overall medals each.
 Junior Greco-Roman:  won both the gold and overall medal tallies.
 June 21 – 26: 2016 European Junior Wrestling Championships in  Bucharest
 Junior Men's Freestyle:  won both the gold and overall medal tallies.
 Junior Women's Freestyle:  won both the gold and overall medal tallies.
 Junior Greco-Roman:  and  won 3 gold medals each. Georgia won the overall medal tally.
 July 1 – 3: 2016 Pan-American Cadet Wrestling Championships in  Lima
 Cadet Men's Freestyle: The  won both the gold and overall medal tallies.
 Cadet Women's Freestyle: The  won the gold medal tally.  won the overall medal tally.
 Cadet Greco-Roman: The  won both the gold and overall medal tallies.
 July 7 – 10: 2016 Asian Cadet Wrestling Championships in  Taichung
 Cadet Men's Freestyle:  won the gold medal tally.  won the overall medal tally.
 Cadet Women's Freestyle:  won both the gold and overall medal tallies.
 Cadet Greco-Roman:  won the gold medal tally.  won the overall medal tally.
 July 19 – 24: 2016 European Cadet Wrestling Championships in  Stockholm
 Cadet Men's Freestyle:  won the gold medal tally.  won the overall medal tally.
 Cadet Women's Freestyle:  won both the gold and overall medal tallies.
 Cadet Greco-Roman:  won both the gold and overall medal tallies.
 October 7 – 9: 2016 Balkan Junior Wrestling Championships in  Craiova
 Junior Men's Freestyle:  won both the gold and overall medal tallies.
 Junior Women's Freestyle:  won the gold medal tally.  won the overall medal tally.
 Junior Greco-Roman:  won both the gold and overall medal tallies.
 November 5 & 6: 2016 Commonwealth Wrestling Championships in 
 Men's Freestyle:  won all the gold medals and won the overall medal tally, too.
 Women's Freestyle:  won both the gold and overall medal tallies.
 Greco-Roman:  won all the gold and silver medals.  won all the bronze medals.
 November 19 & 20: 2016 Mediterranean Wrestling Championships in  Madrid
 Men's Freestyle:  won both the gold and overall medal tallies.
 Women's Freestyle:  and  won 3 gold medals each. Spain won the overall medal tally.
 Greco-Roman:  won both the gold and overall medal tallies.
 Junior Men's Freestyle:  and  won 3 gold medals each. Spain won the overall medal tally.
 Junior Women's Freestyle:  won the gold medal tally.  won the overall medal tally.
 Junior Greco-Roman:  won both the gold and overall medal tallies.

References

Combat sports
combat